Rank comparison chart of air forces non-commissioned officers and other personnel of the European Union member states.

Other ranks

See also 
 Comparative air force officer ranks of the European Union
 Military rank
 Comparative army officer ranks of the European Union
 Comparative army enlisted ranks of the European Union
 Comparative navy officer ranks of the European Union
 Comparative navy enlisted ranks of the European Union
 Ranks and insignia of NATO air forces enlisted
 Comparative air force enlisted ranks of Europe

Notes

References

Europe
Air force ranks
Military comparisons